Takydromus viridipunctatus is a species of lizard in the family Lacertidae. It is endemic to Taiwan.

References

Takydromus
Reptiles described in 2008
Endemic fauna of Taiwan
Reptiles of Taiwan
Taxa named by Si-min Lin
Taxa named by Kuang-yang Lue